Utricularia benjaminiana is a medium-sized suspended or affixed, aquatic, perennial carnivorous plant that belongs to the genus Utricularia (family Lentibulariaceae). Its native distribution includes countries in Africa and Central and South America.

See also 
 List of Utricularia species

References 

Carnivorous plants of Africa
Carnivorous plants of Central America
Carnivorous plants of South America
benjaminiana
Taxa named by Daniel Oliver